α-Pyrrolidinopentiophenone (also known as α-pyrrolidinovalerophenone, α-PVP, O-2387, β-keto-prolintane, prolintanone, or desmethylpyrovalerone) is a synthetic stimulant of the cathinone class developed in the 1960s that has been sold as a designer drug. Colloquially, it is sometimes called flakka. α-PVP is chemically related to pyrovalerone and is the ketone analog of prolintane.

Adverse effects
α-PVP, like other psychostimulants, can cause hyperstimulation, paranoia, and hallucinations. α-PVP has been reported to be the cause, or a significant contributory cause of death in suicides and overdoses caused by combinations of drugs. α-PVP has also been linked to at least one death with pulmonary edema and moderately advanced atherosclerotic coronary disease when it was combined with pentedrone.

According to Craig Crespi in the journal Case Reports in Psychiatry, "symptoms are known to easily escalate into frightening delusions, paranoid psychosis, extreme agitation, and a multitude of other altered mental states." These common adverse effects of α-PVP are in line with other psychostimulants.

In addition, agitated delirium may occur as an adverse effect of α-PVP, which carries its own set of symptoms, including anxiety, agitation, violent outbursts, confusion, myoclonus and convulsions, with clinical symptoms including tachycardia, hypertension, diaphoresis, mydriasis and hyperthermia.

Pharmacology

α-PVP acts as a norepinephrine-dopamine reuptake inhibitor with IC50 values of 14.2 and 12.8 nM, respectively, similar to its methylenedioxy derivative MDPV. Similar to other cathinones, α-PVP has been shown to have reinforcing effects in rats.

Chemistry

α-PVP gives no reaction with the Marquis reagent. It gives a grey/black reaction with the Mecke reagent.

Detection in body fluids

α-PVP may be quantified in blood, plasma or urine by liquid chromatography-mass spectrometry to confirm a diagnosis of poisoning in hospitalized patients or to provide evidence in a medicolegal death investigation. Blood or plasma α-PVP concentrations are expected to be in a range of 10–50 μg/L in persons using the drug recreationally, >100 μg/L in intoxicated patients and >300 μg/L in victims of acute overdosage.

Society and culture

Legal status 

α-PVP is banned in Estonia, Finland, France, Germany, Hungary, Ireland, Latvia, Lithuania, Netherlands, Poland, Romania, Slovenia, Sweden, United Kingdom, Turkey, Norway, as well as the Czech Republic.

Australia
α-PVP is a Schedule 9 prohibited substance under the Poisons Standard (July 2016). A Schedule 9 substance is a substance which may be abused or misused, the manufacture, possession, sale or use of which should be prohibited by law except when required for medical or scientific research, or for analytical, teaching or training purposes with approval of Commonwealth and/or State or Territory Health Authorities. The drug was explicitly made illegal in New South Wales after it was illegally marketed with the imprimatur of erroneous legal advice that it was not encompassed by analog provisions of the relevant act.  It is encompassed by those provisions, and therefore has been illegal for many years in New South Wales. The legislative action followed the death of two individuals from using it; one jumping off a balcony, another having a heart attack after a state of delirium.

EU
α-PVP was required to be banned by EU member states by 3 July 2017 and appears in Schedule II of the UN Convention on Psychotropic Substances.

China
As of October 2015, α-PVP is a controlled substance in China.

Italy
Cathinone and all structurally derived analogues (including pyrovalerone analogues) were classified as narcotics in January 2012.

US
α-PVP is a Schedule I drug in New Mexico, Delaware, Florida, Oklahoma, and Virginia. On 28 January 2014, the DEA listed it, along with nine other synthetic cathinones, on the Schedule 1 with a temporary ban, effective February 27, 2014. The temporary ban was then extended.

Economics 

α-PVP  is sometimes the active ingredient in recreational drugs sold as "bath salts".  It may also be distinguished from "bath salts" and sold under a different name: "flakka", a name used in Florida, or "gravel" in other parts of the U.S. It is reportedly available as cheaply as US$5 per dose. A laboratory for one county in Florida reported a steady rise in α-PVP detections in seized drugs from none in January–February 2014 to 84 in September 2014.

See also 
 α-Pyrrolidinohexiophenone (α-PHP)
 α-Pyrrolidinopentiothiophenone (α-PVT)
 α-PCYP
 4'-Methoxy-α-Pyrrolidinopentiophenone
 Naphyrone (O-2482)
 Pentedrone
 Pentylone
 Prolintane
 Pyrovalerone (O-2371)

Notes

References 

Designer drugs
Norepinephrine–dopamine reuptake inhibitors
Pyrrolidinophenones
Stimulants